This is a partial list of unnumbered minor planets for principal provisional designations assigned between 16 February and 31 March 2002. , a total of 398 bodies remain unnumbered for this period. Objects for this year are listed on the following pages: A–B · C · D–F · G–K · L–O · P · Qi · Qii · Ri · Rii · S · Ti · Tii · U–V and W–Y. Also see previous and next year.

D 

|- id="2002 DA" bgcolor=#d6d6d6
| 0 || 2002 DA || MBA-O || 16.1 || 3.4 km || multiple || 2002–2020 || 20 Apr 2020 || 113 || align=left | Disc.: Ondřejov Obs. || 
|- id="2002 DH2" bgcolor=#FFC2E0
| 1 ||  || APO || 20.3 || data-sort-value="0.31" | 310 m || multiple || 2002–2005 || 14 Feb 2005 || 165 || align=left | Disc.: LONEOS || 
|- id="2002 DC3" bgcolor=#FFC2E0
| 8 ||  || APO || 26.1 || data-sort-value="0.021" | 21 m || single || 48 days || 09 Apr 2002 || 13 || align=left | Disc.: LINEARAMO at MPC || 
|- id="2002 DO3" bgcolor=#FFC2E0
| 6 ||  || APO || 22.0 || data-sort-value="0.14" | 140 m || single || 34 days || 27 Mar 2002 || 79 || align=left | Disc.: LINEARPotentially hazardous object || 
|- id="2002 DQ3" bgcolor=#FFC2E0
| 5 ||  || AMO || 23.8 || data-sort-value="0.062" | 62 m || single || 60 days || 23 Apr 2002 || 65 || align=left | Disc.: NEAT || 
|- id="2002 DN4" bgcolor=#d6d6d6
| 0 ||  || MBA-O || 16.64 || 2.6 km || multiple || 2002–2021 || 07 Nov 2021 || 117 || align=left | Disc.: Cerro TololoAlt.: 2016 TX29 || 
|- id="2002 DQ4" bgcolor=#d6d6d6
| 3 ||  || MBA-O || 17.8 || 1.5 km || multiple || 2002–2017 || 25 Apr 2017 || 20 || align=left | Disc.: Cerro TololoAdded on 22 July 2020 || 
|- id="2002 DS4" bgcolor=#fefefe
| 0 ||  || MBA-I || 18.4 || data-sort-value="0.62" | 620 m || multiple || 2002–2020 || 17 Nov 2020 || 74 || align=left | Disc.: Cerro Tololo || 
|- id="2002 DW4" bgcolor=#fefefe
| 0 ||  || MBA-I || 17.9 || data-sort-value="0.78" | 780 m || multiple || 2000–2021 || 16 Jan 2021 || 82 || align=left | Disc.: Cerro TololoAlt.: 2016 RP6 || 
|- id="2002 DX4" bgcolor=#d6d6d6
| 0 ||  || MBA-O || 16.61 || 2.7 km || multiple || 1994–2021 || 27 Nov 2021 || 109 || align=left | Disc.: Cerro TololoAdded on 22 July 2020 || 
|- id="2002 DA5" bgcolor=#d6d6d6
| 0 ||  || MBA-O || 17.10 || 2.1 km || multiple || 2002–2021 || 25 Nov 2021 || 61 || align=left | Disc.: Cerro Tololo || 
|- id="2002 DU6" bgcolor=#E9E9E9
| 0 ||  || MBA-M || 17.83 || data-sort-value="0.81" | 810 m || multiple || 2002–2022 || 25 Jan 2022 || 97 || align=left | Disc.: Spacewatch || 
|- id="2002 DV6" bgcolor=#fefefe
| 0 ||  || MBA-I || 18.50 || data-sort-value="0.59" | 590 m || multiple || 2002–2021 || 31 Aug 2021 || 124 || align=left | Disc.: SpacewatchAlt.: 2006 KH25 || 
|- id="2002 DA7" bgcolor=#d6d6d6
| 0 ||  || MBA-O || 16.19 || 3.2 km || multiple || 2002–2021 || 08 Dec 2021 || 172 || align=left | Disc.: SpacewatchAlt.: 2009 OS13, 2015 TQ277 || 
|- id="2002 DS11" bgcolor=#fefefe
| 0 ||  || MBA-I || 16.87 || 1.3 km || multiple || 2002–2021 || 07 Nov 2021 || 242 || align=left | Disc.: NEATAlt.: 2010 HE65, 2010 PQ9, 2013 DM9 || 
|- id="2002 DE12" bgcolor=#d6d6d6
| 2 ||  || MBA-O || 16.9 || 2.3 km || multiple || 2002–2019 || 28 Feb 2019 || 43 || align=left | Disc.: LPL/Spacewatch II || 
|- id="2002 DX16" bgcolor=#d6d6d6
| 0 ||  || MBA-O || 16.3 || 3.1 km || multiple || 2002–2019 || 30 Jun 2019 || 82 || align=left | Disc.: LONEOS || 
|- id="2002 DQ17" bgcolor=#E9E9E9
| 0 ||  || MBA-M || 17.31 || 1.9 km || multiple || 2002–2021 || 20 Apr 2021 || 109 || align=left | Disc.: SpacewatchAlt.: 2016 DM6 || 
|- id="2002 DV17" bgcolor=#E9E9E9
| 1 ||  || MBA-M || 18.8 || data-sort-value="0.97" | 970 m || multiple || 2002–2020 || 25 Mar 2020 || 65 || align=left | Disc.: SpacewatchAlt.: 2011 BH111 || 
|- id="2002 DY19" bgcolor=#fefefe
| 1 ||  || HUN || 18.4 || data-sort-value="0.62" | 620 m || multiple || 2002–2020 || 23 Jun 2020 || 70 || align=left | Disc.: NEAT || 
|- id="2002 DX20" bgcolor=#fefefe
| 0 ||  || MBA-I || 16.8 || 2.5 km || multiple || 2002–2021 || 03 Oct 2021 || 179 || align=left | Disc.: NEATAlt.: 2010 GR73 || 
|- id="2002 DC21" bgcolor=#E9E9E9
| 0 ||  || MBA-M || 16.5 || 2.8 km || multiple || 2000–2020 || 25 May 2020 || 223 || align=left | Disc.: NEATAlt.: 2011 FX79 || 
|- id="2002 DD21" bgcolor=#E9E9E9
| 0 ||  || MBA-M || 17.00 || 1.7 km || multiple || 1998–2021 || 28 Nov 2021 || 127 || align=left | Disc.: NEATAlt.: 2011 JL29 || 
|- id="2002 DE21" bgcolor=#d6d6d6
| 0 ||  || MBA-O || 16.34 || 3.0 km || multiple || 2002–2021 || 08 Sep 2021 || 128 || align=left | Disc.: NEAT || 
|- id="2002 DF21" bgcolor=#fefefe
| 0 ||  || HUN || 17.4 || data-sort-value="0.98" | 980 m || multiple || 2002–2020 || 05 Jan 2020 || 170 || align=left | Disc.: NEAT || 
|- id="2002 DH21" bgcolor=#fefefe
| 0 ||  || MBA-I || 18.0 || data-sort-value="0.75" | 750 m || multiple || 2002–2020 || 21 Sep 2020 || 159 || align=left | Disc.: Spacewatch || 
|- id="2002 DJ21" bgcolor=#E9E9E9
| 0 ||  || MBA-M || 16.98 || 2.2 km || multiple || 2002–2021 || 09 Jul 2021 || 113 || align=left | Disc.: Cerro Tololo || 
|- id="2002 DK21" bgcolor=#E9E9E9
| 0 ||  || MBA-M || 17.32 || 1.4 km || multiple || 2002–2021 || 10 Nov 2021 || 155 || align=left | Disc.: Cerro Tololo || 
|- id="2002 DL21" bgcolor=#E9E9E9
| 0 ||  || MBA-M || 17.1 || 1.6 km || multiple || 1995–2020 || 23 Apr 2020 || 72 || align=left | Disc.: Spacewatch || 
|- id="2002 DM21" bgcolor=#E9E9E9
| 0 ||  || MBA-M || 17.69 || 1.6 km || multiple || 2002–2021 || 08 May 2021 || 68 || align=left | Disc.: Spacewatch || 
|- id="2002 DP21" bgcolor=#d6d6d6
| 0 ||  || MBA-O || 16.79 || 2.4 km || multiple || 2002–2021 || 08 Sep 2021 || 59 || align=left | Disc.: NEAT || 
|- id="2002 DR21" bgcolor=#d6d6d6
| 0 ||  || MBA-O || 16.96 || 2.3 km || multiple || 2002–2021 || 28 Nov 2021 || 83 || align=left | Disc.: NEAT || 
|- id="2002 DT21" bgcolor=#d6d6d6
| 2 ||  || MBA-O || 17.3 || 1.9 km || multiple || 2002–2017 || 22 May 2017 || 31 || align=left | Disc.: Cerro Tololo || 
|- id="2002 DU21" bgcolor=#fefefe
| 1 ||  || HUN || 18.8 || data-sort-value="0.52" | 520 m || multiple || 2002–2020 || 02 Dec 2020 || 49 || align=left | Disc.: Spacewatch || 
|- id="2002 DW21" bgcolor=#d6d6d6
| 0 ||  || HIL || 15.50 || 4.4 km || multiple || 2002–2021 || 27 Nov 2021 || 148 || align=left | Disc.: LPL/Spacewatch II || 
|- id="2002 DX21" bgcolor=#d6d6d6
| 0 ||  || MBA-O || 15.54 || 4.3 km || multiple || 2002–2022 || 27 Jan 2022 || 87 || align=left | Disc.: LPL/Spacewatch IIAlt.: 2010 EE154 || 
|- id="2002 DY21" bgcolor=#fefefe
| 0 ||  || MBA-I || 17.74 || data-sort-value="0.84" | 840 m || multiple || 2002–2021 || 16 Apr 2021 || 74 || align=left | Disc.: NEAT || 
|- id="2002 DZ21" bgcolor=#fefefe
| 0 ||  || MBA-I || 18.75 || data-sort-value="0.53" | 530 m || multiple || 2002–2022 || 27 Jan 2022 || 61 || align=left | Disc.: Spacewatch || 
|- id="2002 DB22" bgcolor=#d6d6d6
| 0 ||  || MBA-O || 16.43 || 2.9 km || multiple || 2002–2021 || 27 Nov 2021 || 114 || align=left | Disc.: Cerro Tololo || 
|- id="2002 DC22" bgcolor=#E9E9E9
| 0 ||  || MBA-M || 17.5 || 1.3 km || multiple || 2002–2020 || 14 Aug 2020 || 52 || align=left | Disc.: NEAT || 
|- id="2002 DE22" bgcolor=#E9E9E9
| 0 ||  || MBA-M || 17.81 || 1.5 km || multiple || 2002–2021 || 08 Jun 2021 || 50 || align=left | Disc.: Cerro Tololo || 
|- id="2002 DF22" bgcolor=#d6d6d6
| 0 ||  || MBA-O || 16.47 || 2.8 km || multiple || 2002–2021 || 08 Sep 2021 || 72 || align=left | Disc.: LPL/Spacewatch II || 
|- id="2002 DK22" bgcolor=#E9E9E9
| 0 ||  || MBA-M || 17.97 || 1.1 km || multiple || 2002–2021 || 07 Nov 2021 || 40 || align=left | Disc.: LPL/Spacewatch IIAdded on 9 March 2021 || 
|- id="2002 DL22" bgcolor=#d6d6d6
| 0 ||  || MBA-O || 17.45 || 1.8 km || multiple || 2002–2021 || 01 Oct 2021 || 51 || align=left | Disc.: SpacewatchAdded on 21 August 2021 || 
|}
back to top

E 

|- id="2002 EA" bgcolor=#FFC2E0
| 7 || 2002 EA || APO || 22.4 || data-sort-value="0.12" | 120 m || single || 9 days || 11 Mar 2002 || 113 || align=left | Disc.: Pla D'Arguines Obs. || 
|- id="2002 EC" bgcolor=#FFC2E0
| 6 || 2002 EC || AMO || 23.4 || data-sort-value="0.074" | 74 m || single || 50 days || 23 Apr 2002 || 159 || align=left | Disc.: NEAT || 
|- id="2002 EV" bgcolor=#FFC2E0
| 5 || 2002 EV || AMO || 23.2 || data-sort-value="0.081" | 81 m || single || 58 days || 02 May 2002 || 54 || align=left | Disc.: LINEAR || 
|- id="2002 EW" bgcolor=#FFC2E0
| 4 || 2002 EW || APO || 20.7 || data-sort-value="0.26" | 260 m || multiple || 2002–2006 || 09 Mar 2006 || 108 || align=left | Disc.: LINEAR || 
|- id="2002 EY" bgcolor=#FFC2E0
| 5 || 2002 EY || APO || 19.9 || data-sort-value="0.37" | 370 m || single || 44 days || 18 Apr 2002 || 67 || align=left | Disc.: NEAT || 
|- id="2002 EH1" bgcolor=#FFC2E0
| 0 ||  || AMO || 19.65 || data-sort-value="0.42" | 420 m || multiple || 2002–2022 || 27 Jan 2022 || 41 || align=left | Disc.: NEAT || 
|- id="2002 EN1" bgcolor=#E9E9E9
| 1 ||  || MBA-M || 17.7 || 1.5 km || multiple || 1998–2019 || 23 Aug 2019 || 68 || align=left | Disc.: NEAT || 
|- id="2002 EG2" bgcolor=#E9E9E9
| 0 ||  || MBA-M || 17.69 || 1.6 km || multiple || 2002–2021 || 15 May 2021 || 105 || align=left | Disc.: Bohyunsan Obs.Alt.: 2016 EU74 || 
|- id="2002 EY2" bgcolor=#FFC2E0
| 0 ||  || APO || 19.4 || data-sort-value="0.47" | 470 m || multiple || 2002–2020 || 19 Feb 2020 || 168 || align=left | Disc.: SpacewatchPotentially hazardous object || 
|- id="2002 EC3" bgcolor=#FFC2E0
| 2 ||  || APO || 21.3 || data-sort-value="0.20" | 200 m || multiple || 2002–2018 || 20 Oct 2018 || 91 || align=left | Disc.: LINEAR || 
|- id="2002 EH3" bgcolor=#d6d6d6
| 0 ||  || MBA-O || 17.08 || 2.1 km || multiple || 2002–2019 || 25 Jul 2019 || 59 || align=left | Disc.: AMOSAlt.: 2013 CG79 || 
|- id="2002 EZ4" bgcolor=#fefefe
| 0 ||  || MBA-I || 18.1 || data-sort-value="0.71" | 710 m || multiple || 2002–2021 || 09 Jan 2021 || 128 || align=left | Disc.: ADAS || 
|- id="2002 ET5" bgcolor=#FA8072
| 1 ||  || MCA || 19.5 || data-sort-value="0.70" | 700 m || multiple || 2002–2016 || 10 Aug 2016 || 47 || align=left | Disc.: AMOS || 
|- id="2002 EG6" bgcolor=#FA8072
| 0 ||  || HUN || 19.25 || data-sort-value="0.42" | 420 m || multiple || 2002–2021 || 30 Sep 2021 || 113 || align=left | Disc.: NEATAlt.: 2016 TM69 || 
|- id="2002 EW6" bgcolor=#fefefe
| 0 ||  || MBA-I || 18.34 || data-sort-value="0.64" | 640 m || multiple || 2002–2021 || 30 Jun 2021 || 102 || align=left | Disc.: Siding SpringAlt.: 2013 CD96 || 
|- id="2002 EE7" bgcolor=#d6d6d6
| 0 ||  || MBA-O || 16.45 || 2.9 km || multiple || 2002–2021 || 07 Oct 2021 || 69 || align=left | Disc.: Siding Spring || 
|- id="2002 EM7" bgcolor=#FFC2E0
| 7 ||  || ATE || 24.4 || data-sort-value="0.047" | 47 m || single || 25 days || 06 Apr 2002 || 69 || align=left | Disc.: LINEAR || 
|- id="2002 EN7" bgcolor=#FFC2E0
| 3 ||  || APO || 21.2 || data-sort-value="0.20" | 200 m || multiple || 2002–2016 || 01 Apr 2016 || 47 || align=left | Disc.: NEAT || 
|- id="2002 EW8" bgcolor=#FFC2E0
| 0 ||  || APO || 23.84 || data-sort-value="0.061" | 61 m || multiple || 2002–2007 || 21 Mar 2007 || 110 || align=left | Disc.: LINEAR || 
|- id="2002 EX8" bgcolor=#FFC2E0
| 1 ||  || APO || 20.8 || data-sort-value="0.25" | 250 m || multiple || 2002–2015 || 18 Sep 2015 || 219 || align=left | Disc.: LINEAR || 
|- id="2002 EP10" bgcolor=#E9E9E9
| 1 ||  || MBA-M || 17.2 || 2.0 km || multiple || 2002–2020 || 18 May 2020 || 110 || align=left | Disc.: NEATAlt.: 2011 DA12 || 
|- id="2002 ES11" bgcolor=#FFC2E0
| 4 ||  || AMO || 21.9 || data-sort-value="0.15" | 150 m || single || 87 days || 08 Jun 2002 || 28 || align=left | Disc.: Spacewatch || 
|- id="2002 ET11" bgcolor=#FFC2E0
| 2 ||  || AMO || 20.2 || data-sort-value="0.32" | 320 m || multiple || 2002–2017 || 14 Sep 2017 || 47 || align=left | Disc.: Spacewatch || 
|- id="2002 EU11" bgcolor=#FFC2E0
| 6 ||  || APO || 21.9 || data-sort-value="0.15" | 150 m || single || 13 days || 26 Mar 2002 || 71 || align=left | Disc.: NEATPotentially hazardous object || 
|- id="2002 EV11" bgcolor=#FFC2E0
| 3 ||  || APO || 20.0 || data-sort-value="0.36" | 360 m || multiple || 2002–2014 || 20 Apr 2014 || 78 || align=left | Disc.: NEATPotentially hazardous object || 
|- id="2002 EW11" bgcolor=#FFC2E0
| 7 ||  || APO || 24.8 || data-sort-value="0.039" | 39 m || single || 10 days || 22 Mar 2002 || 43 || align=left | Disc.: NEAT || 
|- id="2002 EY11" bgcolor=#FFC2E0
| 5 ||  || AMO || 22.2 || data-sort-value="0.13" | 130 m || single || 35 days || 18 Apr 2002 || 36 || align=left | Disc.: NEAT || 
|- id="2002 EG17" bgcolor=#E9E9E9
| 0 ||  || MBA-M || 18.61 || data-sort-value="0.80" | 800 m || multiple || 2002–2021 || 29 Sep 2021 || 27 || align=left | Disc.: Spacewatch || 
|- id="2002 EW17" bgcolor=#E9E9E9
| 0 ||  || MBA-M || 17.4 || data-sort-value="0.98" | 980 m || multiple || 2002–2020 || 06 Dec 2020 || 100 || align=left | Disc.: Spacewatch || 
|- id="2002 EY17" bgcolor=#E9E9E9
| 0 ||  || MBA-M || 17.4 || 1.8 km || multiple || 1995–2021 || 07 Jun 2021 || 101 || align=left | Disc.: SpacewatchAlt.: 2016 FH7 || 
|- id="2002 EH18" bgcolor=#d6d6d6
| 0 ||  || MBA-O || 17.0 || 2.2 km || multiple || 2002–2021 || 18 Jan 2021 || 96 || align=left | Disc.: LPL/Spacewatch II || 
|- id="2002 ER18" bgcolor=#fefefe
| 0 ||  || MBA-I || 18.35 || data-sort-value="0.64" | 640 m || multiple || 2002–2021 || 09 Apr 2021 || 105 || align=left | Disc.: LPL/Spacewatch IIAlt.: 2005 ES57, 2009 QP4, 2015 MS26 || 
|- id="2002 ET18" bgcolor=#fefefe
| 0 ||  || MBA-I || 18.91 || data-sort-value="0.49" | 490 m || multiple || 2002–2021 || 09 Apr 2021 || 80 || align=left | Disc.: Spacewatch || 
|- id="2002 EY22" bgcolor=#E9E9E9
| 0 ||  || MBA-M || 17.35 || 1.8 km || multiple || 2002–2021 || 02 Dec 2021 || 66 || align=left | Disc.: NEATAlt.: 2010 FO71 || 
|- id="2002 EZ23" bgcolor=#fefefe
| 0 ||  || MBA-I || 18.6 || data-sort-value="0.57" | 570 m || multiple || 2002–2020 || 19 Apr 2020 || 79 || align=left | Disc.: SpacewatchAlt.: 2016 BK18 || 
|- id="2002 EC25" bgcolor=#d6d6d6
| 0 ||  || MBA-O || 17.3 || 1.9 km || multiple || 2002–2019 || 05 Aug 2019 || 45 || align=left | Disc.: LPL/Spacewatch II || 
|- id="2002 EN27" bgcolor=#E9E9E9
| 0 ||  || MBA-M || 17.52 || data-sort-value="0.93" | 930 m || multiple || 2002–2021 || 28 Nov 2021 || 99 || align=left | Disc.: LINEAR || 
|- id="2002 EC32" bgcolor=#d6d6d6
| 0 ||  || MBA-O || 16.58 || 2.7 km || multiple || 2002–2021 || 06 Nov 2021 || 103 || align=left | Disc.: NEAT || 
|- id="2002 EO34" bgcolor=#E9E9E9
| 0 ||  || MBA-M || 16.4 || 2.9 km || multiple || 2002–2020 || 18 May 2020 || 168 || align=left | Disc.: NEATAlt.: 2011 ES16 || 
|- id="2002 EX35" bgcolor=#fefefe
| 0 ||  || MBA-I || 18.19 || data-sort-value="0.68" | 680 m || multiple || 2002–2021 || 04 Oct 2021 || 77 || align=left | Disc.: SpacewatchAdded on 9 March 2021 || 
|- id="2002 EY35" bgcolor=#fefefe
| 0 ||  || MBA-I || 18.5 || data-sort-value="0.59" | 590 m || multiple || 2002–2021 || 18 Jan 2021 || 66 || align=left | Disc.: Spacewatch || 
|- id="2002 EB36" bgcolor=#d6d6d6
| 2 ||  || MBA-O || 17.2 || 2.0 km || multiple || 2002–2019 || 04 Apr 2019 || 22 || align=left | Disc.: SpacewatchAdded on 24 December 2021 || 
|- id="2002 ED36" bgcolor=#E9E9E9
| 2 ||  || MBA-M || 18.74 || data-sort-value="0.96" | 760 m || multiple || 2002–2023 || 16 Mar 2023 || 42 || align=left | Disc.: SpacewatchAdded on 17 January 2021 || 
|- id="2002 EE36" bgcolor=#E9E9E9
| 0 ||  || MBA-M || 16.71 || 2.5 km || multiple || 2002–2021 || 03 May 2021 || 189 || align=left | Disc.: Spacewatch || 
|- id="2002 EO36" bgcolor=#E9E9E9
| 0 ||  || MBA-M || 17.96 || 1.4 km || multiple || 2002–2021 || 11 May 2021 || 49 || align=left | Disc.: Spacewatch || 
|- id="2002 EQ36" bgcolor=#fefefe
| 2 ||  || MBA-I || 19.1 || data-sort-value="0.45" | 450 m || multiple || 2002–2017 || 17 May 2017 || 23 || align=left | Disc.: Spacewatch || 
|- id="2002 ES36" bgcolor=#fefefe
| 2 ||  || MBA-I || 18.2 || data-sort-value="0.68" | 680 m || multiple || 2013–2017 || 26 Apr 2017 || 30 || align=left | Disc.: SpacewatchAlt.: 2017 FZ122 || 
|- id="2002 EC37" bgcolor=#E9E9E9
| 1 ||  || MBA-M || 18.4 || 1.2 km || multiple || 2002–2020 || 29 Apr 2020 || 44 || align=left | Disc.: SpacewatchAlt.: 2015 BJ225 || 
|- id="2002 EL37" bgcolor=#d6d6d6
| 0 ||  || MBA-O || 17.3 || 1.9 km || multiple || 2002–2021 || 18 Jan 2021 || 69 || align=left | Disc.: SpacewatchAlt.: 2016 AA70 || 
|- id="2002 EU37" bgcolor=#fefefe
| 0 ||  || MBA-I || 17.93 || data-sort-value="0.77" | 770 m || multiple || 1999–2022 || 27 Jan 2022 || 110 || align=left | Disc.: Spacewatch || 
|- id="2002 EP38" bgcolor=#fefefe
| 0 ||  || MBA-I || 17.4 || data-sort-value="0.98" | 980 m || multiple || 2002–2021 || 11 Jan 2021 || 101 || align=left | Disc.: SpacewatchAlt.: 2010 BK67, 2010 PM6 || 
|- id="2002 EJ46" bgcolor=#FA8072
| 3 ||  || MCA || 17.7 || 1.6 km || multiple || 2002–2017 || 21 Feb 2017 || 47 || align=left | Disc.: NEAT || 
|- id="2002 EM47" bgcolor=#fefefe
| 0 ||  || MBA-I || 18.20 || data-sort-value="0.68" | 680 m || multiple || 1998–2021 || 13 May 2021 || 100 || align=left | Disc.: NEATAlt.: 2013 BX36 || 
|- id="2002 ET49" bgcolor=#d6d6d6
| 0 ||  || MBA-O || 16.87 || 2.4 km || multiple || 2002–2022 || 10 Jan 2022 || 84 || align=left | Disc.: NEAT || 
|- id="2002 EL50" bgcolor=#fefefe
| 0 ||  || MBA-I || 17.5 || data-sort-value="0.94" | 940 m || multiple || 2002–2020 || 10 Oct 2020 || 175 || align=left | Disc.: NEATAlt.: 2012 BH102 || 
|- id="2002 EJ51" bgcolor=#fefefe
| 0 ||  || MBA-I || 18.53 || data-sort-value="0.58" | 580 m || multiple || 2002–2021 || 03 May 2021 || 75 || align=left | Disc.: Spacewatch || 
|- id="2002 EB58" bgcolor=#E9E9E9
| 0 ||  || MBA-M || 16.42 || 1.5 km || multiple || 2002–2022 || 24 Jan 2022 || 313 || align=left | Disc.: LINEAR || 
|- id="2002 EU66" bgcolor=#fefefe
| 0 ||  || MBA-I || 17.32 || 1.0 km || multiple || 2002–2021 || 14 May 2021 || 207 || align=left | Disc.: LINEARAlt.: 2012 YX8 || 
|- id="2002 EQ76" bgcolor=#E9E9E9
| 0 ||  || MBA-M || 16.97 || 2.2 km || multiple || 2002–2021 || 13 May 2021 || 183 || align=left | Disc.: SpacewatchAlt.: 2004 TG80, 2007 EG160, 2010 BG153 || 
|- id="2002 ET76" bgcolor=#E9E9E9
| 0 ||  || MBA-M || 17.8 || 1.2 km || multiple || 2002–2020 || 12 Sep 2020 || 71 || align=left | Disc.: Spacewatch || 
|- id="2002 EW76" bgcolor=#d6d6d6
| 0 ||  || MBA-O || 16.9 || 2.3 km || multiple || 2002–2021 || 18 Jan 2021 || 123 || align=left | Disc.: SpacewatchAlt.: 2004 RB128 || 
|- id="2002 EO78" bgcolor=#E9E9E9
| 0 ||  || MBA-M || 18.04 || data-sort-value="0.73" | 730 m || multiple || 2002–2022 || 25 Jan 2022 || 91 || align=left | Disc.: LPL/Spacewatch IIAlt.: 2010 CW248, 2014 BV6 || 
|- id="2002 EJ79" bgcolor=#fefefe
| 0 ||  || MBA-I || 17.53 || data-sort-value="0.93" | 930 m || multiple || 2002–2021 || 13 May 2021 || 230 || align=left | Disc.: AMOS || 
|- id="2002 ED94" bgcolor=#fefefe
| 0 ||  || MBA-I || 17.12 || 1.1 km || multiple || 2002–2021 || 08 Apr 2021 || 151 || align=left | Disc.: LINEAR || 
|- id="2002 EW94" bgcolor=#E9E9E9
| 0 ||  || MBA-M || 16.3 || 3.1 km || multiple || 1993–2020 || 20 Apr 2020 || 188 || align=left | Disc.: La Silla Obs.Alt.: 1993 FX49, 2010 BA115, 2013 RC51 || 
|- id="2002 EY95" bgcolor=#fefefe
| 0 ||  || MBA-I || 17.6 || data-sort-value="0.90" | 900 m || multiple || 2002–2021 || 07 Jun 2021 || 133 || align=left | Disc.: LINEAR || 
|- id="2002 ET103" bgcolor=#E9E9E9
| 0 ||  || MBA-M || 17.0 || 1.2 km || multiple || 2002–2020 || 19 Oct 2020 || 128 || align=left | Disc.: LPL/Spacewatch IIAdded on 22 July 2020 || 
|- id="2002 EU104" bgcolor=#fefefe
| 0 ||  || HUN || 19.21 || data-sort-value="0.43" | 430 m || multiple || 2002–2021 || 31 Aug 2021 || 49 || align=left | Disc.: NEAT || 
|- id="2002 EG108" bgcolor=#E9E9E9
| 0 ||  || MBA-M || 16.68 || 2.6 km || multiple || 2002–2021 || 09 Sep 2021 || 118 || align=left | Disc.: NEATAlt.: 2017 OO37 || 
|- id="2002 EY109" bgcolor=#E9E9E9
| 0 ||  || MBA-M || 17.04 || 1.2 km || multiple || 2002–2021 || 06 Dec 2021 || 152 || align=left | Disc.: SpacewatchAlt.: 2006 DG10, 2010 JR101, 2017 TP7 || 
|- id="2002 EH112" bgcolor=#fefefe
| 0 ||  || MBA-I || 18.3 || data-sort-value="0.65" | 650 m || multiple || 2002–2019 || 11 Aug 2019 || 104 || align=left | Disc.: SpacewatchAlt.: 2015 ET65 || 
|- id="2002 ED114" bgcolor=#fefefe
| 0 ||  || MBA-I || 18.0 || data-sort-value="0.75" | 750 m || multiple || 1999–2020 || 16 Dec 2020 || 142 || align=left | Disc.: SpacewatchAlt.: 2005 AB70 || 
|- id="2002 EH114" bgcolor=#d6d6d6
| 0 ||  || MBA-O || 16.4 || 2.9 km || multiple || 2002–2020 || 24 Jan 2020 || 116 || align=left | Disc.: SpacewatchAlt.: 2007 GF13 || 
|- id="2002 EG116" bgcolor=#FFC2E0
| 2 ||  || AMO || 21.66 || data-sort-value="0.25" | 170 m || multiple || 2002-2022 || 03 Aug 2022 || 37 || align=left | Disc.: NEAT || 
|- id="2002 EH116" bgcolor=#fefefe
| 0 ||  || MBA-I || 18.4 || data-sort-value="0.62" | 620 m || multiple || 2000–2020 || 25 May 2020 || 86 || align=left | Disc.: NEAT || 
|- id="2002 ER116" bgcolor=#fefefe
| 0 ||  || MBA-I || 19.0 || data-sort-value="0.43" | 500 m || multiple || 2002-2022 || 25 May 2022 || 40 || align=left | Disc.: SpacewatchAlt.: 2015 CW80 || 
|- id="2002 EC117" bgcolor=#E9E9E9
| 0 ||  || MBA-M || 17.68 || 1.2 km || multiple || 2002–2022 || 06 Jan 2022 || 102 || align=left | Disc.: SpacewatchAdded on 22 July 2020 || 
|- id="2002 EW117" bgcolor=#E9E9E9
| 3 ||  || MBA-M || 17.5 || data-sort-value="0.94" | 940 m || multiple || 2002–2020 || 13 Sep 2020 || 26 || align=left | Disc.: Spacewatch || 
|- id="2002 EB120" bgcolor=#d6d6d6
| 0 ||  || MBA-O || 16.33 || 3.0 km || multiple || 2002–2021 || 26 Oct 2021 || 135 || align=left | Disc.: SpacewatchAlt.: 2015 PE118 || 
|- id="2002 EY120" bgcolor=#d6d6d6
| 0 ||  || MBA-O || 16.7 || 2.5 km || multiple || 2002–2020 || 13 Jul 2020 || 55 || align=left | Disc.: Spacewatch || 
|- id="2002 EG121" bgcolor=#FA8072
| 0 ||  || HUN || 19.07 || data-sort-value="0.46" | 460 m || multiple || 2002–2021 || 03 Dec 2021 || 50 || align=left | Disc.: Spacewatch || 
|- id="2002 EE122" bgcolor=#E9E9E9
| 0 ||  || MBA-M || 17.70 || 1.6 km || multiple || 2002–2021 || 14 May 2021 || 66 || align=left | Disc.: NEAT || 
|- id="2002 EN127" bgcolor=#fefefe
| 0 ||  || MBA-I || 17.67 || data-sort-value="0.87" | 870 m || multiple || 2000–2021 || 25 Nov 2021 || 220 || align=left | Disc.: NEATAlt.: 2010 KY80, 2013 KL5, 2014 UN79 || 
|- id="2002 EC131" bgcolor=#E9E9E9
| 1 ||  || MBA-M || 18.52 || data-sort-value="0.59" | 590 m || multiple || 2002–2022 || 04 Jan 2022 || 39 || align=left | Disc.: NEATAlt.: 2013 YN85 || 
|- id="2002 EO131" bgcolor=#E9E9E9
| 0 ||  || MBA-M || 17.81 || data-sort-value="0.81" | 810 m || multiple || 2002–2020 || 15 Oct 2020 || 86 || align=left | Disc.: LINEARAlt.: 2006 EM52 || 
|- id="2002 EA133" bgcolor=#E9E9E9
| 0 ||  || MBA-M || 17.0 || 1.7 km || multiple || 2002–2020 || 04 Nov 2020 || 72 || align=left | Disc.: NEAT || 
|- id="2002 EN133" bgcolor=#d6d6d6
| 0 ||  || MBA-O || 16.65 || 2.6 km || multiple || 1997–2021 || 10 May 2021 || 167 || align=left | Disc.: LINEARAlt.: 2015 XS278 || 
|- id="2002 EX136" bgcolor=#fefefe
| 0 ||  || MBA-I || 18.57 || data-sort-value="0.57" | 570 m || multiple || 2002–2021 || 15 Apr 2021 || 63 || align=left | Disc.: NEAT || 
|- id="2002 EN140" bgcolor=#fefefe
| 0 ||  || MBA-I || 18.16 || data-sort-value="0.69" | 690 m || multiple || 1995–2021 || 01 Nov 2021 || 63 || align=left | Disc.: NEATAlt.: 2003 SO374 || 
|- id="2002 EP142" bgcolor=#fefefe
| 1 ||  || MBA-I || 18.1 || data-sort-value="0.71" | 710 m || multiple || 2002–2021 || 22 Mar 2021 || 45 || align=left | Disc.: NEAT || 
|- id="2002 EO144" bgcolor=#C2FFFF
| 0 ||  || JT || 13.43 || 11 km || multiple || 2002–2021 || 27 Nov 2021 || 174 || align=left | Disc.: NEATGreek camp (L4) || 
|- id="2002 EF145" bgcolor=#fefefe
| 0 ||  || MBA-I || 18.00 || data-sort-value="0.75" | 750 m || multiple || 2002–2021 || 14 May 2021 || 117 || align=left | Disc.: LINEAR || 
|- id="2002 EV145" bgcolor=#d6d6d6
| 0 ||  || MBA-O || 16.7 || 2.5 km || multiple || 2002–2021 || 17 Jan 2021 || 84 || align=left | Disc.: NEATAlt.: 2016 CS25 || 
|- id="2002 EH147" bgcolor=#fefefe
| 0 ||  || HUN || 18.0 || data-sort-value="0.75" | 750 m || multiple || 2002–2021 || 19 Jan 2021 || 169 || align=left | Disc.: SpacewatchAlt.: 2013 CW122 || 
|- id="2002 EZ150" bgcolor=#E9E9E9
| – ||  || MBA-M || 16.8 || 1.3 km || single || 20 days || 04 Apr 2002 || 12 || align=left | Disc.: NEAT || 
|- id="2002 ET153" bgcolor=#E9E9E9
| 0 ||  || MBA-M || 16.7 || 2.5 km || multiple || 1999–2021 || 08 Jun 2021 || 139 || align=left | Disc.: Mount Nyukasa Stn.Alt.: 2004 TX230, 2016 EF155 || 
|- id="2002 EC156" bgcolor=#fefefe
| 0 ||  || MBA-I || 18.3 || data-sort-value="0.65" | 650 m || multiple || 2002–2020 || 14 Feb 2020 || 46 || align=left | Disc.: ADAS || 
|- id="2002 EN156" bgcolor=#E9E9E9
| 2 ||  || MBA-M || 18.2 || data-sort-value="0.96" | 960 m || multiple || 2002–2016 || 03 Aug 2016 || 32 || align=left | Disc.: ADASAlt.: 2015 EZ44 || 
|- id="2002 EP156" bgcolor=#fefefe
| 0 ||  || MBA-I || 18.9 || data-sort-value="0.49" | 490 m || multiple || 2002–2021 || 18 Jan 2021 || 51 || align=left | Disc.: ADASAdded on 19 October 2020 || 
|- id="2002 EQ157" bgcolor=#C2FFFF
| 0 ||  || JT || 14.55 || 6.8 km || multiple || 2002–2021 || 07 Nov 2021 || 64 || align=left | Disc.: NEATGreek camp (L4)Alt.: 2014 EL197 || 
|- id="2002 ES157" bgcolor=#E9E9E9
| 0 ||  || MBA-M || 17.93 || 1.4 km || multiple || 2002–2021 || 30 Jul 2021 || 64 || align=left | Disc.: NEAT || 
|- id="2002 EG158" bgcolor=#d6d6d6
| 0 ||  || MBA-O || 16.9 || 2.3 km || multiple || 2002–2020 || 21 Apr 2020 || 48 || align=left | Disc.: SDSS || 
|- id="2002 EM158" bgcolor=#C2FFFF
| 0 ||  || JT || 14.10 || 8.4 km || multiple || 1996–2021 || 28 Nov 2021 || 200 || align=left | Disc.: SDSSGreek camp (L4) || 
|- id="2002 ER158" bgcolor=#d6d6d6
| 0 ||  || MBA-O || 16.86 || 2.4 km || multiple || 2002–2021 || 30 Jul 2021 || 67 || align=left | Disc.: SDSSAlt.: 2013 AB60 || 
|- id="2002 EU158" bgcolor=#C2FFFF
| 0 ||  || JT || 14.83 || 6.0 km || multiple || 2002–2021 || 11 Nov 2021 || 139 || align=left | Disc.: SDSSGreek camp (L4) || 
|- id="2002 EV158" bgcolor=#E9E9E9
| 0 ||  || MBA-M || 16.93 || 1.7 km || multiple || 2002–2021 || 25 Nov 2021 || 111 || align=left | Disc.: SDSS || 
|- id="2002 EY158" bgcolor=#d6d6d6
| 0 ||  || MBA-O || 16.81 || 2.4 km || multiple || 2002–2021 || 02 Dec 2021 || 86 || align=left | Disc.: SDSS || 
|- id="2002 EZ158" bgcolor=#E9E9E9
| 3 ||  || MBA-M || 18.3 || data-sort-value="0.65" | 650 m || multiple || 2002–2019 || 10 Jun 2019 || 26 || align=left | Disc.: SDSSAdded on 22 July 2020 || 
|- id="2002 EH159" bgcolor=#d6d6d6
| 0 ||  || MBA-O || 17.11 || 2.1 km || multiple || 2002–2021 || 11 Nov 2021 || 59 || align=left | Disc.: SDSSAdded on 22 July 2020 || 
|- id="2002 EP159" bgcolor=#E9E9E9
| 2 ||  || MBA-M || 18.54 || data-sort-value="0.82" | 820 m || multiple || 2002–2020 || 17 Jul 2020 || 16 || align=left | Disc.: SDSSAdded on 29 January 2022 || 
|- id="2002 EX159" bgcolor=#d6d6d6
| 0 ||  || MBA-O || 17.11 || 2.1 km || multiple || 2002–2021 || 08 Nov 2021 || 81 || align=left | Disc.: SDSSAdded on 22 July 2020 || 
|- id="2002 EY159" bgcolor=#E9E9E9
| 0 ||  || MBA-M || 17.90 || 1.1 km || multiple || 2002–2021 || 06 Oct 2021 || 53 || align=left | Disc.: SDSSAdded on 22 July 2020Alt.: 2006 CO11 || 
|- id="2002 EH160" bgcolor=#fefefe
| 0 ||  || HUN || 19.2 || data-sort-value="0.43" | 430 m || multiple || 2002–2020 || 19 Apr 2020 || 24 || align=left | Disc.: NEATAdded on 30 September 2021 || 
|- id="2002 EU162" bgcolor=#d6d6d6
| 0 ||  || MBA-O || 16.65 || 2.6 km || multiple || 2002–2021 || 10 Sep 2021 || 56 || align=left | Disc.: NEAT || 
|- id="2002 EV162" bgcolor=#fefefe
| 0 ||  || MBA-I || 17.2 || 1.1 km || multiple || 2002–2021 || 15 Jan 2021 || 133 || align=left | Disc.: NEATAlt.: 2014 LO17 || 
|- id="2002 EA163" bgcolor=#fefefe
| 0 ||  || MBA-I || 17.5 || data-sort-value="0.94" | 940 m || multiple || 2002–2018 || 07 Sep 2018 || 113 || align=left | Disc.: NEATAlt.: 2011 UJ69, 2013 CJ103 || 
|- id="2002 ER163" bgcolor=#fefefe
| 0 ||  || MBA-I || 17.7 || data-sort-value="0.86" | 860 m || multiple || 2002–2021 || 11 Jun 2021 || 173 || align=left | Disc.: NEATAlt.: 2013 CT85 || 
|- id="2002 EV163" bgcolor=#E9E9E9
| 0 ||  || MBA-M || 17.14 || 1.6 km || multiple || 2002–2021 || 13 Sep 2021 || 105 || align=left | Disc.: NEATAlt.: 2010 EY9 || 
|- id="2002 EW163" bgcolor=#fefefe
| 1 ||  || HUN || 18.7 || data-sort-value="0.54" | 540 m || multiple || 2002–2019 || 05 Nov 2019 || 57 || align=left | Disc.: NEATAlt.: 2018 EU9 || 
|- id="2002 EY163" bgcolor=#fefefe
| 0 ||  || MBA-I || 17.52 || data-sort-value="0.93" | 930 m || multiple || 1994–2021 || 11 Jul 2021 || 229 || align=left | Disc.: AMOSAlt.: 2013 AB112 || 
|- id="2002 EM164" bgcolor=#d6d6d6
| 0 ||  || MBA-O || 17.10 || 2.1 km || multiple || 2002–2021 || 26 Nov 2021 || 100 || align=left | Disc.: Spacewatch || 
|- id="2002 EP164" bgcolor=#d6d6d6
| 0 ||  || MBA-O || 17.22 || 2.0 km || multiple || 2002–2021 || 31 Aug 2021 || 38 || align=left | Disc.: SDSSAdded on 21 August 2021 || 
|- id="2002 EQ164" bgcolor=#E9E9E9
| 0 ||  || MBA-M || 17.40 || data-sort-value="0.98" | 980 m || multiple || 2000–2022 || 22 Jan 2022 || 140 || align=left | Disc.: LPL/Spacewatch IIAlt.: 2014 CN10 || 
|- id="2002 EV164" bgcolor=#E9E9E9
| 1 ||  || MBA-M || 16.58 || 1.4 km || multiple || 2002–2022 || 27 Jan 2022 || 176 || align=left | Disc.: SpacewatchAlt.: 2010 HQ28 || 
|- id="2002 EX164" bgcolor=#fefefe
| 0 ||  || MBA-I || 18.21 || data-sort-value="0.68" | 680 m || multiple || 2000–2021 || 08 Sep 2021 || 125 || align=left | Disc.: Spacewatch || 
|- id="2002 EZ164" bgcolor=#fefefe
| 0 ||  || MBA-I || 18.0 || data-sort-value="0.75" | 750 m || multiple || 2002–2019 || 07 Dec 2019 || 95 || align=left | Disc.: SDSS || 
|- id="2002 EC165" bgcolor=#d6d6d6
| 0 ||  || MBA-O || 16.0 || 3.5 km || multiple || 2002–2020 || 17 May 2020 || 117 || align=left | Disc.: SDSS || 
|- id="2002 ED165" bgcolor=#fefefe
| 0 ||  || MBA-I || 17.9 || data-sort-value="0.78" | 780 m || multiple || 2002–2020 || 16 Oct 2020 || 107 || align=left | Disc.: SDSS || 
|- id="2002 EE165" bgcolor=#E9E9E9
| 0 ||  || MBA-M || 17.09 || 1.1 km || multiple || 2002–2022 || 06 Jan 2022 || 157 || align=left | Disc.: SDSSAlt.: 2010 JY24 || 
|- id="2002 EF165" bgcolor=#d6d6d6
| 0 ||  || MBA-O || 16.52 || 2.8 km || multiple || 2002–2021 || 30 Sep 2021 || 89 || align=left | Disc.: LONEOS || 
|- id="2002 EG165" bgcolor=#fefefe
| 0 ||  || MBA-I || 18.29 || data-sort-value="0.65" | 650 m || multiple || 2002–2022 || 06 Jan 2022 || 115 || align=left | Disc.: SDSS || 
|- id="2002 EK165" bgcolor=#fefefe
| 0 ||  || MBA-I || 17.7 || data-sort-value="0.86" | 860 m || multiple || 2002–2019 || 20 Dec 2019 || 74 || align=left | Disc.: LPL/Spacewatch II || 
|- id="2002 EL165" bgcolor=#d6d6d6
| 0 ||  || MBA-O || 16.90 || 2.3 km || multiple || 2002–2021 || 13 Sep 2021 || 90 || align=left | Disc.: SDSS || 
|- id="2002 EM165" bgcolor=#fefefe
| 0 ||  || MBA-I || 17.3 || 1.0 km || multiple || 2002–2020 || 10 Dec 2020 || 154 || align=left | Disc.: SDSS || 
|- id="2002 EP165" bgcolor=#d6d6d6
| 0 ||  || MBA-O || 15.6 || 4.2 km || multiple || 2002–2020 || 21 Jul 2020 || 124 || align=left | Disc.: SDSSAlt.: 2010 JG12 || 
|- id="2002 ET165" bgcolor=#d6d6d6
| 0 ||  || MBA-O || 16.9 || 2.3 km || multiple || 2002–2021 || 18 Jan 2021 || 89 || align=left | Disc.: Spacewatch || 
|- id="2002 EW165" bgcolor=#d6d6d6
| 0 ||  || MBA-O || 16.2 || 3.2 km || multiple || 2002–2020 || 18 May 2020 || 72 || align=left | Disc.: SDSS || 
|- id="2002 EX165" bgcolor=#fefefe
| 0 ||  || MBA-I || 18.4 || data-sort-value="0.62" | 620 m || multiple || 2002–2021 || 17 Jan 2021 || 86 || align=left | Disc.: NEAT || 
|- id="2002 EY165" bgcolor=#d6d6d6
| 0 ||  || MBA-O || 16.22 || 3.2 km || multiple || 2002–2021 || 06 Nov 2021 || 101 || align=left | Disc.: SDSSAlt.: 2010 LT58 || 
|- id="2002 EZ165" bgcolor=#d6d6d6
| 0 ||  || MBA-O || 16.64 || 2.6 km || multiple || 2002–2021 || 05 Dec 2021 || 116 || align=left | Disc.: SDSSAlt.: 2010 OJ146 || 
|- id="2002 EA166" bgcolor=#fefefe
| 0 ||  || MBA-I || 18.43 || data-sort-value="0.61" | 610 m || multiple || 2002–2021 || 09 Jul 2021 || 75 || align=left | Disc.: SDSS || 
|- id="2002 EB166" bgcolor=#d6d6d6
| 0 ||  || MBA-O || 16.89 || 2.3 km || multiple || 2002–2021 || 05 Oct 2021 || 74 || align=left | Disc.: Spacewatch || 
|- id="2002 EC166" bgcolor=#fefefe
| 0 ||  || MBA-I || 17.7 || data-sort-value="0.86" | 860 m || multiple || 2002–2021 || 05 Jan 2021 || 74 || align=left | Disc.: NEAT || 
|- id="2002 EL166" bgcolor=#E9E9E9
| 0 ||  || MBA-M || 17.24 || 1.1 km || multiple || 2002–2022 || 21 Jan 2022 || 90 || align=left | Disc.: SDSS || 
|- id="2002 EM166" bgcolor=#fefefe
| 0 ||  || MBA-I || 17.5 || data-sort-value="0.94" | 940 m || multiple || 2002–2021 || 11 Jun 2021 || 146 || align=left | Disc.: Spacewatch || 
|- id="2002 EN166" bgcolor=#E9E9E9
| 0 ||  || MBA-M || 16.7 || 2.5 km || multiple || 2002–2020 || 17 Apr 2020 || 76 || align=left | Disc.: NEATAlt.: 2011 BE85 || 
|- id="2002 EO166" bgcolor=#fefefe
| 0 ||  || MBA-I || 18.5 || data-sort-value="0.59" | 590 m || multiple || 2002–2019 || 28 Aug 2019 || 68 || align=left | Disc.: SDSS || 
|- id="2002 EP166" bgcolor=#d6d6d6
| 0 ||  || MBA-O || 17.03 || 2.2 km || multiple || 1995–2021 || 13 Jul 2021 || 64 || align=left | Disc.: SDSS || 
|- id="2002 EQ166" bgcolor=#E9E9E9
| 0 ||  || MBA-M || 17.80 || 1.2 km || multiple || 2002–2021 || 06 Nov 2021 || 70 || align=left | Disc.: SDSS || 
|- id="2002 ES166" bgcolor=#fefefe
| 0 ||  || MBA-I || 18.2 || data-sort-value="0.68" | 680 m || multiple || 2002–2020 || 05 Nov 2020 || 115 || align=left | Disc.: SDSS || 
|- id="2002 ET166" bgcolor=#fefefe
| 0 ||  || MBA-I || 18.2 || data-sort-value="0.68" | 680 m || multiple || 2002–2021 || 05 Jun 2021 || 104 || align=left | Disc.: Spacewatch || 
|- id="2002 EU166" bgcolor=#d6d6d6
| 0 ||  || MBA-O || 16.81 || 2.4 km || multiple || 2002–2021 || 27 Nov 2021 || 167 || align=left | Disc.: SpacewatchAlt.: 2010 MW107 || 
|- id="2002 EW166" bgcolor=#fefefe
| 0 ||  || MBA-I || 17.93 || data-sort-value="0.77" | 770 m || multiple || 2002–2021 || 17 Apr 2021 || 90 || align=left | Disc.: SDSS || 
|- id="2002 EX166" bgcolor=#fefefe
| 0 ||  || MBA-I || 17.6 || data-sort-value="0.90" | 900 m || multiple || 2002–2020 || 14 Dec 2020 || 62 || align=left | Disc.: SDSS || 
|- id="2002 EA167" bgcolor=#fefefe
| 0 ||  || MBA-I || 18.8 || data-sort-value="0.52" | 520 m || multiple || 2002–2020 || 15 Dec 2020 || 73 || align=left | Disc.: Spacewatch || 
|- id="2002 EC167" bgcolor=#fefefe
| 0 ||  || MBA-I || 18.3 || data-sort-value="0.65" | 650 m || multiple || 2002–2020 || 23 Dec 2020 || 79 || align=left | Disc.: SDSS || 
|- id="2002 EE167" bgcolor=#E9E9E9
| 0 ||  || MBA-M || 17.1 || 2.1 km || multiple || 2002–2021 || 07 Jun 2021 || 98 || align=left | Disc.: SDSS || 
|- id="2002 EF167" bgcolor=#d6d6d6
| 0 ||  || MBA-O || 17.17 || 2.0 km || multiple || 2002–2022 || 27 Jan 2022 || 95 || align=left | Disc.: SDSS || 
|- id="2002 EH167" bgcolor=#E9E9E9
| 0 ||  || MBA-M || 17.52 || data-sort-value="0.93" | 930 m || multiple || 2002–2021 || 06 Dec 2021 || 97 || align=left | Disc.: SDSS || 
|- id="2002 EJ167" bgcolor=#E9E9E9
| 0 ||  || MBA-M || 17.73 || data-sort-value="0.85" | 850 m || multiple || 2002–2021 || 28 Nov 2021 || 89 || align=left | Disc.: SDSS || 
|- id="2002 EK167" bgcolor=#d6d6d6
| 0 ||  || MBA-O || 16.79 || 2.4 km || multiple || 2002–2021 || 26 Nov 2021 || 96 || align=left | Disc.: SDSS || 
|- id="2002 EL167" bgcolor=#d6d6d6
| 0 ||  || MBA-O || 16.8 || 2.4 km || multiple || 2002–2020 || 26 May 2020 || 62 || align=left | Disc.: Spacewatch || 
|- id="2002 EM167" bgcolor=#fefefe
| 0 ||  || MBA-I || 18.42 || data-sort-value="0.62" | 620 m || multiple || 2002–2021 || 10 May 2021 || 86 || align=left | Disc.: SDSS || 
|- id="2002 EN167" bgcolor=#E9E9E9
| 0 ||  || MBA-M || 17.0 || 1.7 km || multiple || 2002–2020 || 16 May 2020 || 72 || align=left | Disc.: SDSSAlt.: 2015 FU449 || 
|- id="2002 EO167" bgcolor=#fefefe
| 0 ||  || MBA-I || 18.39 || data-sort-value="0.62" | 620 m || multiple || 2002–2021 || 08 May 2021 || 82 || align=left | Disc.: Spacewatch || 
|- id="2002 EP167" bgcolor=#fefefe
| 0 ||  || MBA-I || 18.7 || data-sort-value="0.54" | 540 m || multiple || 2002–2020 || 13 Sep 2020 || 56 || align=left | Disc.: ADAS || 
|- id="2002 EQ167" bgcolor=#d6d6d6
| 0 ||  || MBA-O || 17.0 || 2.2 km || multiple || 2002–2021 || 15 Jan 2021 || 98 || align=left | Disc.: SDSSAlt.: 2016 CS || 
|- id="2002 EU167" bgcolor=#d6d6d6
| 0 ||  || MBA-O || 16.69 || 2.6 km || multiple || 2002–2021 || 13 Sep 2021 || 66 || align=left | Disc.: SDSS || 
|- id="2002 EV167" bgcolor=#d6d6d6
| 0 ||  || MBA-O || 16.9 || 2.3 km || multiple || 2002–2019 || 03 Apr 2019 || 42 || align=left | Disc.: LPL/Spacewatch II || 
|- id="2002 EX167" bgcolor=#E9E9E9
| 0 ||  || MBA-M || 17.59 || 1.7 km || multiple || 2002–2021 || 09 May 2021 || 60 || align=left | Disc.: Spacewatch || 
|- id="2002 EY167" bgcolor=#d6d6d6
| 0 ||  || MBA-O || 16.2 || 3.2 km || multiple || 2002–2021 || 09 Jan 2021 || 86 || align=left | Disc.: SDSS || 
|- id="2002 EA168" bgcolor=#fefefe
| 0 ||  || MBA-I || 18.0 || data-sort-value="0.75" | 750 m || multiple || 2002–2020 || 20 Oct 2020 || 71 || align=left | Disc.: Spacewatch || 
|- id="2002 EB168" bgcolor=#d6d6d6
| 0 ||  || MBA-O || 16.63 || 2.6 km || multiple || 2002–2022 || 27 Jan 2022 || 94 || align=left | Disc.: SDSS || 
|- id="2002 EC168" bgcolor=#fefefe
| 1 ||  || MBA-I || 18.7 || data-sort-value="0.54" | 540 m || multiple || 2002–2020 || 22 Jul 2020 || 52 || align=left | Disc.: Spacewatch || 
|- id="2002 EE168" bgcolor=#fefefe
| 0 ||  || MBA-I || 18.6 || data-sort-value="0.57" | 570 m || multiple || 2002–2019 || 25 Sep 2019 || 42 || align=left | Disc.: SDSS || 
|- id="2002 EF168" bgcolor=#d6d6d6
| 0 ||  || MBA-O || 16.3 || 3.1 km || multiple || 2002–2020 || 26 May 2020 || 51 || align=left | Disc.: SDSS || 
|- id="2002 EH168" bgcolor=#E9E9E9
| 0 ||  || MBA-M || 17.77 || 1.6 km || multiple || 2002–2021 || 08 May 2021 || 49 || align=left | Disc.: Spacewatch || 
|- id="2002 EJ168" bgcolor=#fefefe
| 0 ||  || MBA-I || 18.5 || data-sort-value="0.59" | 590 m || multiple || 2002–2020 || 26 Jan 2020 || 43 || align=left | Disc.: SDSS || 
|- id="2002 EK168" bgcolor=#fefefe
| 0 ||  || MBA-I || 18.44 || data-sort-value="0.61" | 610 m || multiple || 2002–2021 || 01 Nov 2021 || 101 || align=left | Disc.: SDSS || 
|- id="2002 EM168" bgcolor=#fefefe
| 0 ||  || MBA-I || 18.2 || data-sort-value="0.68" | 680 m || multiple || 2002–2021 || 21 Jan 2021 || 45 || align=left | Disc.: SDSS || 
|- id="2002 EN168" bgcolor=#fefefe
| 0 ||  || MBA-I || 18.84 || data-sort-value="0.51" | 510 m || multiple || 2002–2021 || 04 Oct 2021 || 42 || align=left | Disc.: SDSS || 
|- id="2002 EQ168" bgcolor=#E9E9E9
| 0 ||  || MBA-M || 16.89 || 1.8 km || multiple || 2002–2021 || 18 Jul 2021 || 106 || align=left | Disc.: SDSS || 
|- id="2002 ES168" bgcolor=#E9E9E9
| 0 ||  || MBA-M || 16.8 || 2.4 km || multiple || 2002–2020 || 25 Feb 2020 || 58 || align=left | Disc.: SDSS || 
|- id="2002 ET168" bgcolor=#fefefe
| 0 ||  || MBA-I || 19.1 || data-sort-value="0.45" | 450 m || multiple || 2002–2020 || 13 Sep 2020 || 41 || align=left | Disc.: SDSS || 
|- id="2002 EU168" bgcolor=#E9E9E9
| 0 ||  || MBA-M || 18.09 || 1.0 km || multiple || 2002–2021 || 03 Oct 2021 || 57 || align=left | Disc.: SDSS || 
|- id="2002 EV168" bgcolor=#fefefe
| 0 ||  || MBA-I || 18.1 || data-sort-value="0.71" | 710 m || multiple || 2002–2021 || 11 Jun 2021 || 326 || align=left | Disc.: LPL/Spacewatch II || 
|- id="2002 EW168" bgcolor=#E9E9E9
| 0 ||  || MBA-M || 17.97 || data-sort-value="0.76" | 760 m || multiple || 2002–2022 || 25 Jan 2022 || 43 || align=left | Disc.: SDSS || 
|- id="2002 EY168" bgcolor=#E9E9E9
| 0 ||  || MBA-M || 17.80 || 1.2 km || multiple || 2002–2021 || 31 Oct 2021 || 76 || align=left | Disc.: SDSS || 
|- id="2002 EZ168" bgcolor=#fefefe
| 0 ||  || MBA-I || 16.7 || 1.4 km || multiple || 2002–2021 || 16 Jan 2021 || 66 || align=left | Disc.: SDSSAlt.: 2010 LE99 || 
|- id="2002 EA169" bgcolor=#fefefe
| 0 ||  || MBA-I || 18.53 || data-sort-value="0.58" | 580 m || multiple || 2002–2021 || 26 Nov 2021 || 35 || align=left | Disc.: SDSS || 
|- id="2002 EB169" bgcolor=#E9E9E9
| 0 ||  || MBA-M || 17.8 || 1.5 km || multiple || 2002–2021 || 09 Jun 2021 || 29 || align=left | Disc.: LPL/Spacewatch II || 
|- id="2002 ED169" bgcolor=#d6d6d6
| 0 ||  || MBA-O || 16.63 || 2.6 km || multiple || 2002–2021 || 03 Dec 2021 || 158 || align=left | Disc.: SDSS || 
|- id="2002 EG169" bgcolor=#E9E9E9
| 0 ||  || MBA-M || 17.48 || 1.8 km || multiple || 2002–2021 || 08 May 2021 || 86 || align=left | Disc.: SDSS || 
|- id="2002 EJ169" bgcolor=#d6d6d6
| 0 ||  || MBA-O || 16.97 || 2.2 km || multiple || 2002–2021 || 15 Aug 2021 || 79 || align=left | Disc.: LPL/Spacewatch II || 
|- id="2002 EL169" bgcolor=#fefefe
| 0 ||  || MBA-I || 17.8 || data-sort-value="0.82" | 820 m || multiple || 2002–2021 || 14 Jun 2021 || 107 || align=left | Disc.: SDSS || 
|- id="2002 EM169" bgcolor=#E9E9E9
| 0 ||  || MBA-M || 16.96 || 2.3 km || multiple || 2002–2021 || 30 May 2021 || 85 || align=left | Disc.: LPL/Spacewatch II || 
|- id="2002 EN169" bgcolor=#fefefe
| 0 ||  || MBA-I || 18.70 || data-sort-value="0.54" | 540 m || multiple || 2002–2021 || 08 May 2021 || 90 || align=left | Disc.: SDSS || 
|- id="2002 EP169" bgcolor=#d6d6d6
| 0 ||  || MBA-O || 16.68 || 2.6 km || multiple || 2002–2021 || 08 Aug 2021 || 81 || align=left | Disc.: SDSS || 
|- id="2002 ER169" bgcolor=#d6d6d6
| 0 ||  || HIL || 15.61 || 4.2 km || multiple || 2002–2021 || 29 Oct 2021 || 114 || align=left | Disc.: SDSSAlt.: 2010 LO3 || 
|- id="2002 ET169" bgcolor=#d6d6d6
| 0 ||  || MBA-O || 17.2 || 2.0 km || multiple || 2002–2021 || 23 Jan 2021 || 63 || align=left | Disc.: SDSS || 
|- id="2002 EU169" bgcolor=#d6d6d6
| 0 ||  || MBA-O || 16.39 || 2.9 km || multiple || 2002–2021 || 26 Nov 2021 || 116 || align=left | Disc.: SDSS || 
|- id="2002 EV169" bgcolor=#fefefe
| 0 ||  || MBA-I || 18.68 || data-sort-value="0.55" | 550 m || multiple || 2002–2021 || 10 Apr 2021 || 54 || align=left | Disc.: SDSS || 
|- id="2002 EW169" bgcolor=#fefefe
| 0 ||  || MBA-I || 18.3 || data-sort-value="0.65" | 650 m || multiple || 2002–2021 || 11 Jun 2021 || 115 || align=left | Disc.: SDSS || 
|- id="2002 EZ169" bgcolor=#d6d6d6
| 0 ||  || MBA-O || 17.0 || 2.2 km || multiple || 2002–2020 || 22 Jun 2020 || 64 || align=left | Disc.: LPL/Spacewatch II || 
|- id="2002 EA170" bgcolor=#d6d6d6
| 0 ||  || MBA-O || 17.2 || 2.0 km || multiple || 2002–2020 || 18 Oct 2020 || 164 || align=left | Disc.: Spacewatch || 
|- id="2002 EB170" bgcolor=#d6d6d6
| 0 ||  || MBA-O || 17.27 || 2.0 km || multiple || 1996–2021 || 04 Oct 2021 || 52 || align=left | Disc.: Spacewatch || 
|- id="2002 EE170" bgcolor=#fefefe
| 0 ||  || MBA-I || 18.7 || data-sort-value="0.54" | 540 m || multiple || 2002–2019 || 28 Nov 2019 || 46 || align=left | Disc.: Spacewatch || 
|- id="2002 EG170" bgcolor=#d6d6d6
| 0 ||  || MBA-O || 17.07 || 2.1 km || multiple || 2002–2021 || 07 Nov 2021 || 47 || align=left | Disc.: SDSS || 
|- id="2002 EH170" bgcolor=#fefefe
| 0 ||  || MBA-I || 18.4 || data-sort-value="0.62" | 620 m || multiple || 2002–2020 || 15 Oct 2020 || 56 || align=left | Disc.: Spacewatch || 
|- id="2002 EJ170" bgcolor=#d6d6d6
| 0 ||  || MBA-O || 16.6 || 2.7 km || multiple || 2002–2019 || 28 Feb 2019 || 39 || align=left | Disc.: SDSS || 
|- id="2002 EL170" bgcolor=#fefefe
| 0 ||  || HUN || 19.14 || data-sort-value="0.44" | 440 m || multiple || 2002–2021 || 30 Apr 2021 || 44 || align=left | Disc.: Spacewatch || 
|- id="2002 EM170" bgcolor=#fefefe
| 0 ||  || MBA-I || 18.55 || data-sort-value="0.58" | 580 m || multiple || 2002–2021 || 14 Apr 2021 || 55 || align=left | Disc.: SDSS || 
|- id="2002 EP170" bgcolor=#fefefe
| 2 ||  || HUN || 19.1 || data-sort-value="0.45" | 450 m || multiple || 2002–2019 || 27 Sep 2019 || 29 || align=left | Disc.: SDSS || 
|- id="2002 EQ170" bgcolor=#E9E9E9
| 3 ||  || MBA-M || 18.4 || data-sort-value="0.88" | 880 m || multiple || 2002–2019 || 10 Mar 2019 || 26 || align=left | Disc.: NEAT || 
|- id="2002 ER170" bgcolor=#E9E9E9
| 2 ||  || MBA-M || 18.5 || data-sort-value="0.84" | 840 m || multiple || 2002–2019 || 08 Feb 2019 || 28 || align=left | Disc.: SDSS || 
|- id="2002 ET170" bgcolor=#fefefe
| 0 ||  || MBA-I || 18.51 || data-sort-value="0.59" | 590 m || multiple || 2002–2021 || 14 Aug 2021 || 103 || align=left | Disc.: SDSS || 
|- id="2002 EU170" bgcolor=#d6d6d6
| 0 ||  || MBA-O || 17.3 || 1.9 km || multiple || 2002–2019 || 04 Sep 2019 || 72 || align=left | Disc.: SDSS || 
|- id="2002 EW170" bgcolor=#E9E9E9
| 0 ||  || MBA-M || 17.57 || 1.3 km || multiple || 2002–2021 || 09 Nov 2021 || 105 || align=left | Disc.: SDSS || 
|- id="2002 EX170" bgcolor=#d6d6d6
| 0 ||  || MBA-O || 16.80 || 2.4 km || multiple || 2002–2021 || 10 Aug 2021 || 59 || align=left | Disc.: SDSS || 
|- id="2002 EA171" bgcolor=#C2FFFF
| 0 ||  || JT || 14.50 || 7.0 km || multiple || 2002–2021 || 25 Nov 2021 || 255 || align=left | Disc.: LPL/Spacewatch IIGreek camp (L4) || 
|- id="2002 EB171" bgcolor=#d6d6d6
| 0 ||  || MBA-O || 17.3 || 1.9 km || multiple || 2002–2019 || 24 Oct 2019 || 48 || align=left | Disc.: SDSS || 
|- id="2002 EC171" bgcolor=#C2FFFF
| 0 ||  || JT || 14.56 || 6.8 km || multiple || 2002–2021 || 27 Nov 2021 || 81 || align=left | Disc.: SDSSGreek camp (L4) || 
|- id="2002 EE171" bgcolor=#fefefe
| 0 ||  || MBA-I || 18.75 || data-sort-value="0.53" | 530 m || multiple || 2002–2021 || 10 Apr 2021 || 41 || align=left | Disc.: SDSS || 
|- id="2002 EF171" bgcolor=#C2FFFF
| 0 ||  || JT || 14.41 || 7.3 km || multiple || 2002–2021 || 08 Nov 2021 || 68 || align=left | Disc.: SDSSGreek camp (L4) || 
|- id="2002 EG171" bgcolor=#d6d6d6
| 0 ||  || MBA-O || 17.09 || 2.1 km || multiple || 2002–2021 || 08 Sep 2021 || 51 || align=left | Disc.: Spacewatch || 
|- id="2002 EH171" bgcolor=#d6d6d6
| 0 ||  || MBA-O || 17.62 || 1.7 km || multiple || 2002–2021 || 02 Oct 2021 || 35 || align=left | Disc.: Spacewatch || 
|- id="2002 EK171" bgcolor=#fefefe
| 0 ||  || MBA-I || 18.4 || data-sort-value="0.62" | 620 m || multiple || 2002–2020 || 11 Dec 2020 || 39 || align=left | Disc.: LPL/Spacewatch II || 
|- id="2002 EM171" bgcolor=#E9E9E9
| 0 ||  || MBA-M || 17.9 || data-sort-value="0.78" | 780 m || multiple || 2002–2020 || 17 Sep 2020 || 42 || align=left | Disc.: SDSS || 
|- id="2002 EN171" bgcolor=#d6d6d6
| 0 ||  || MBA-O || 17.5 || 1.8 km || multiple || 2002–2019 || 31 May 2019 || 21 || align=left | Disc.: SDSS || 
|- id="2002 EP171" bgcolor=#fefefe
| 0 ||  || MBA-I || 18.6 || data-sort-value="0.57" | 570 m || multiple || 2002–2020 || 22 Jan 2020 || 50 || align=left | Disc.: SDSS || 
|- id="2002 ER171" bgcolor=#d6d6d6
| 0 ||  || MBA-O || 16.52 || 2.8 km || multiple || 2002–2021 || 08 Sep 2021 || 88 || align=left | Disc.: LPL/Spacewatch II || 
|- id="2002 ES171" bgcolor=#fefefe
| 0 ||  || MBA-I || 18.29 || data-sort-value="0.65" | 650 m || multiple || 2002–2021 || 05 Oct 2021 || 63 || align=left | Disc.: SDSS || 
|- id="2002 ET171" bgcolor=#d6d6d6
| 0 ||  || MBA-O || 16.8 || 2.4 km || multiple || 2002–2019 || 24 Sep 2019 || 42 || align=left | Disc.: SDSS || 
|- id="2002 EU171" bgcolor=#fefefe
| 0 ||  || MBA-I || 18.09 || data-sort-value="0.72" | 720 m || multiple || 2002–2021 || 08 Nov 2021 || 87 || align=left | Disc.: Spacewatch || 
|- id="2002 EV171" bgcolor=#d6d6d6
| 0 ||  || MBA-O || 16.9 || 2.3 km || multiple || 2002–2019 || 26 Feb 2019 || 35 || align=left | Disc.: LPL/Spacewatch II || 
|- id="2002 EW171" bgcolor=#d6d6d6
| 0 ||  || MBA-O || 16.79 || 2.4 km || multiple || 2002–2021 || 30 Aug 2021 || 43 || align=left | Disc.: LPL/Spacewatch II || 
|- id="2002 EX171" bgcolor=#E9E9E9
| 0 ||  || MBA-M || 17.9 || 1.1 km || multiple || 2002–2020 || 10 Oct 2020 || 40 || align=left | Disc.: SDSS || 
|- id="2002 EY171" bgcolor=#fefefe
| 0 ||  || MBA-I || 18.81 || data-sort-value="0.51" | 510 m || multiple || 2002–2021 || 04 May 2021 || 61 || align=left | Disc.: LPL/Spacewatch II || 
|- id="2002 EZ171" bgcolor=#d6d6d6
| 0 ||  || MBA-O || 17.4 || 1.8 km || multiple || 2002–2019 || 05 May 2019 || 30 || align=left | Disc.: SDSS || 
|- id="2002 EA172" bgcolor=#d6d6d6
| 0 ||  || MBA-O || 16.73 || 2.5 km || multiple || 2002–2021 || 30 Oct 2021 || 92 || align=left | Disc.: SDSS || 
|- id="2002 EB172" bgcolor=#fefefe
| 0 ||  || MBA-I || 18.9 || data-sort-value="0.49" | 490 m || multiple || 2002–2020 || 15 Feb 2020 || 55 || align=left | Disc.: LPL/Spacewatch II || 
|- id="2002 EC172" bgcolor=#E9E9E9
| 0 ||  || MBA-M || 17.5 || 1.8 km || multiple || 2002–2020 || 27 Feb 2020 || 67 || align=left | Disc.: SDSS || 
|- id="2002 ED172" bgcolor=#E9E9E9
| 0 ||  || MBA-M || 17.95 || 1.4 km || multiple || 2002–2021 || 31 May 2021 || 53 || align=left | Disc.: LPL/Spacewatch II || 
|- id="2002 EE172" bgcolor=#fefefe
| 0 ||  || MBA-I || 18.67 || data-sort-value="0.55" | 550 m || multiple || 2002–2021 || 11 May 2021 || 49 || align=left | Disc.: Spacewatch || 
|- id="2002 EF172" bgcolor=#fefefe
| 0 ||  || MBA-I || 18.18 || data-sort-value="0.69" | 690 m || multiple || 2002–2021 || 09 May 2021 || 50 || align=left | Disc.: SDSS || 
|- id="2002 EG172" bgcolor=#fefefe
| 0 ||  || MBA-I || 18.9 || data-sort-value="0.49" | 490 m || multiple || 2002–2020 || 14 Feb 2020 || 38 || align=left | Disc.: Spacewatch || 
|- id="2002 EH172" bgcolor=#fefefe
| 1 ||  || MBA-I || 18.9 || data-sort-value="0.49" | 490 m || multiple || 2002–2020 || 15 Feb 2020 || 43 || align=left | Disc.: SDSS || 
|- id="2002 EJ172" bgcolor=#E9E9E9
| 0 ||  || MBA-M || 18.03 || data-sort-value="0.74" | 740 m || multiple || 2002–2022 || 27 Jan 2022 || 60 || align=left | Disc.: SDSSAlt.: 2010 GP55 || 
|- id="2002 EK172" bgcolor=#d6d6d6
| 0 ||  || MBA-O || 17.5 || 1.8 km || multiple || 2002–2020 || 14 Sep 2020 || 50 || align=left | Disc.: SDSSAlt.: 2013 HY88 || 
|- id="2002 EL172" bgcolor=#fefefe
| 0 ||  || MBA-I || 18.6 || data-sort-value="0.57" | 570 m || multiple || 2002–2020 || 23 Mar 2020 || 41 || align=left | Disc.: LPL/Spacewatch II || 
|- id="2002 EM172" bgcolor=#d6d6d6
| 0 ||  || MBA-O || 16.58 || 2.7 km || multiple || 2002–2021 || 08 Nov 2021 || 50 || align=left | Disc.: SDSS || 
|- id="2002 EN172" bgcolor=#E9E9E9
| 0 ||  || MBA-M || 18.04 || 1.4 km || multiple || 2002–2021 || 08 Sep 2021 || 65 || align=left | Disc.: LPL/Spacewatch IIAdded on 22 July 2020 || 
|- id="2002 EO172" bgcolor=#E9E9E9
| 0 ||  || MBA-M || 17.95 || 1.1 km || multiple || 2002–2021 || 09 Nov 2021 || 58 || align=left | Disc.: LPL/Spacewatch IIAdded on 19 October 2020 || 
|- id="2002 EQ172" bgcolor=#fefefe
| 0 ||  || MBA-I || 18.69 || data-sort-value="0.54" | 540 m || multiple || 2002–2021 || 03 Apr 2021 || 59 || align=left | Disc.: SpacewatchAdded on 17 January 2021 || 
|- id="2002 ER172" bgcolor=#fefefe
| 0 ||  || MBA-I || 18.72 || data-sort-value="0.54" | 540 m || multiple || 1995–2021 || 26 Oct 2021 || 42 || align=left | Disc.: SpacewatchAdded on 9 March 2021 || 
|- id="2002 ET172" bgcolor=#fefefe
| 0 ||  || MBA-I || 18.9 || data-sort-value="0.49" | 490 m || multiple || 2002–2021 || 19 Apr 2021 || 46 || align=left | Disc.: SpacewatchAdded on 17 June 2021 || 
|- id="2002 EW172" bgcolor=#E9E9E9
| 0 ||  || MBA-M || 18.57 || data-sort-value="0.81" | 810 m || multiple || 2002–2021 || 05 Oct 2021 || 25 || align=left | Disc.: SDSSAdded on 21 August 2021 || 
|- id="2002 EX172" bgcolor=#d6d6d6
| 0 ||  || MBA-O || 16.62 || 2.6 km || multiple || 2002–2021 || 15 Aug 2021 || 49 || align=left | Disc.: SDSSAdded on 24 December 2021 || 
|}
back to top

F 

|- id="2002 FA" bgcolor=#FA8072
| 1 || 2002 FA || MCA || 18.4 || data-sort-value="0.62" | 620 m || multiple || 2002–2017 || 25 Dec 2017 || 114 || align=left | Disc.: LINEAR || 
|- id="2002 FB" bgcolor=#FFC2E0
| 7 || 2002 FB || APO || 26.6 || data-sort-value="0.017" | 17 m || single || 2 days || 18 Mar 2002 || 21 || align=left | Disc.: LINEAR || 
|- id="2002 FC" bgcolor=#FFC2E0
| 0 || 2002 FC || APO || 19.16 || data-sort-value="0.52" | 520 m || multiple || 2002–2021 || 18 Apr 2021 || 232 || align=left | Disc.: LONEOSPotentially hazardous object || 
|- id="2002 FW1" bgcolor=#FFC2E0
| 9 ||  || ATE || 24.0 || data-sort-value="0.056" | 56 m || single || 21 days || 09 Apr 2002 || 14 || align=left | Disc.: NEAT || 
|- id="2002 FG3" bgcolor=#d6d6d6
| 0 ||  || MBA-O || 17.3 || 1.9 km || multiple || 2002–2019 || 09 Jul 2019 || 108 || align=left | Disc.: AMOSAlt.: 2013 CW125 || 
|- id="2002 FW4" bgcolor=#fefefe
| 0 ||  || MBA-I || 17.36 || 1.0 km || multiple || 2002–2021 || 18 May 2021 || 167 || align=left | Disc.: NEATAlt.: 2013 AM99 || 
|- id="2002 FP5" bgcolor=#FFC2E0
| 5 ||  || AMO || 21.1 || data-sort-value="0.21" | 210 m || single || 44 days || 02 May 2002 || 50 || align=left | Disc.: NEAT || 
|- id="2002 FQ5" bgcolor=#FFC2E0
| 1 ||  || APO || 20.5 || data-sort-value="0.28" | 280 m || multiple || 2002–2010 || 10 Apr 2010 || 76 || align=left | Disc.: LONEOSPotentially hazardous object || 
|- id="2002 FR5" bgcolor=#FA8072
| – ||  || MCA || 20.1 || data-sort-value="0.53" | 530 m || single || 13 days || 02 Apr 2002 || 24 || align=left | Disc.: NEAT || 
|- id="2002 FT5" bgcolor=#FFC2E0
| 0 ||  || ATE || 21.58 || data-sort-value="0.17" | 170 m || multiple || 2002–2021 || 14 Apr 2021 || 82 || align=left | Disc.: LINEAR || 
|- id="2002 FU5" bgcolor=#FFC2E0
| 4 ||  || APO || 21.0 || data-sort-value="0.22" | 220 m || single || 34 days || 14 Apr 2002 || 69 || align=left | Disc.: NEAT || 
|- id="2002 FC6" bgcolor=#FA8072
| 0 ||  || MCA || 17.50 || 1.3 km || multiple || 2002–2019 || 26 Jul 2019 || 368 || align=left | Disc.: LONEOS || 
|- id="2002 FH6" bgcolor=#FA8072
| 1 ||  || HUN || 18.4 || data-sort-value="0.62" | 620 m || multiple || 2002–2020 || 05 Nov 2020 || 77 || align=left | Disc.: LINEAR || 
|- id="2002 FS6" bgcolor=#FFC2E0
| 8 ||  || APO || 24.8 || data-sort-value="0.039" | 39 m || single || 5 days || 26 Mar 2002 || 10 || align=left | Disc.: LINEARAMO at MPC || 
|- id="2002 FT6" bgcolor=#FFC2E0
| 4 ||  || ATE || 22.6 || data-sort-value="0.11" | 110 m || multiple || 2002–2019 || 25 Jun 2019 || 67 || align=left | Disc.: LINEAR || 
|- id="2002 FV6" bgcolor=#C2E0FF
| 3 ||  || TNO || 6.8 || 145 km || multiple || 2002–2015 || 18 Feb 2015 || 19 || align=left | Disc.: Mauna Kea Obs.LoUTNOs, cubewano (cold) || 
|- id="2002 FX6" bgcolor=#C2E0FF
| E ||  || TNO || 6.9 || 173 km || single || 19 days || 08 Apr 2002 || 6 || align=left | Disc.: Mauna Kea Obs.LoUTNOs, other TNO || 
|- id="2002 FD7" bgcolor=#fefefe
| 1 ||  || MBA-I || 17.2 || 1.1 km || multiple || 2002–2020 || 24 Mar 2020 || 89 || align=left | Disc.: NEATAlt.: 2011 US4 || 
|- id="2002 FO7" bgcolor=#FFC2E0
| 2 ||  || APO || 20.17 || data-sort-value="0.33" | 330 m || multiple || 2002–2021 || 18 Apr 2021 || 40 || align=left | Disc.: SpacewatchAdded on 11 May 2021Alt.: 2021 FQ1 || 
|- id="2002 FP7" bgcolor=#C2E0FF
| E ||  || TNO || 8.5 || 94 km || single || 15 days || 06 Apr 2002 || 5 || align=left | Disc.: Mauna Kea Obs.LoUTNOs, plutino? || 
|- id="2002 FJ8" bgcolor=#E9E9E9
| 1 ||  || MBA-M || 17.41 || data-sort-value="0.98" | 980 m || multiple || 2002–2021 || 28 Nov 2021 || 102 || align=left | Disc.: LINEAR || 
|- id="2002 FV12" bgcolor=#FA8072
| 0 ||  || HUN || 18.57 || data-sort-value="0.57" | 570 m || multiple || 2002–2021 || 08 Aug 2021 || 72 || align=left | Disc.: LINEAR || 
|- id="2002 FF15" bgcolor=#fefefe
| 0 ||  || MBA-I || 17.33 || 1.0 km || multiple || 2000–2022 || 25 Jan 2022 || 259 || align=left | Disc.: AMOS || 
|- id="2002 FZ15" bgcolor=#fefefe
| 0 ||  || MBA-I || 17.60 || data-sort-value="0.90" | 900 m || multiple || 2002–2021 || 14 Jun 2021 || 225 || align=left | Disc.: AMOSAlt.: 2013 AD61 || 
|- id="2002 FM17" bgcolor=#fefefe
| 0 ||  || MBA-I || 18.0 || data-sort-value="0.75" | 750 m || multiple || 2002–2021 || 09 Jan 2021 || 61 || align=left | Disc.: Kitt Peak Obs.Alt.: 2008 TT88, 2012 XF26, 2012 XY158 || 
|- id="2002 FO17" bgcolor=#d6d6d6
| 0 ||  || MBA-O || 17.63 || 1.7 km || multiple || 2002–2021 || 31 Oct 2021 || 86 || align=left | Disc.: Kitt Peak Obs.Added on 5 November 2021Alt.: 2015 PR80 || 
|- id="2002 FT17" bgcolor=#d6d6d6
| 1 ||  || MBA-O || 17.9 || 1.5 km || multiple || 2002–2019 || 28 May 2019 || 21 || align=left | Disc.: Kitt Peak Obs.Added on 17 January 2021 || 
|- id="2002 FZ17" bgcolor=#E9E9E9
| 3 ||  || MBA-M || 18.32 || data-sort-value="0.91" | 910 m || multiple || 2002–2017 || 16 Oct 2017 || 22 || align=left | Disc.: Kitt Peak Obs. || 
|- id="2002 FK18" bgcolor=#fefefe
| 0 ||  || MBA-I || 18.89 || data-sort-value="0.50" | 500 m || multiple || 2002–2021 || 29 Nov 2021 || 74 || align=left | Disc.: Kitt Peak Obs. || 
|- id="2002 FL18" bgcolor=#d6d6d6
| 0 ||  || MBA-O || 17.20 || 2.0 km || multiple || 2002–2021 || 30 Sep 2021 || 43 || align=left | Disc.: Kitt Peak Obs. || 
|- id="2002 FM18" bgcolor=#fefefe
| 0 ||  || MBA-I || 18.26 || data-sort-value="0.66" | 660 m || multiple || 2002–2021 || 09 May 2021 || 36 || align=left | Disc.: Kitt Peak Obs. || 
|- id="2002 FV18" bgcolor=#C2FFFF
| 6 ||  || JT || 15.0 || 5.6 km || single || 82 days || 06 Apr 2002 || 8 || align=left | Disc.: Kitt Peak Obs.Greek camp (L4) || 
|- id="2002 FF19" bgcolor=#fefefe
| 0 ||  || MBA-I || 19.56 || data-sort-value="0.36" | 360 m || multiple || 2002–2021 || 31 Oct 2021 || 46 || align=left | Disc.: Kitt Peak Obs.Alt.: 2016 FG27 || 
|- id="2002 FG19" bgcolor=#E9E9E9
| 0 ||  || MBA-M || 18.00 || 1.1 km || multiple || 2002–2021 || 07 Oct 2021 || 77 || align=left | Disc.: Kitt Peak Obs.Added on 22 July 2020Alt.: 2015 FY219 || 
|- id="2002 FK19" bgcolor=#d6d6d6
| 0 ||  || MBA-O || 17.3 || 1.9 km || multiple || 2002–2020 || 13 Sep 2020 || 40 || align=left | Disc.: Kitt Peak Obs. || 
|- id="2002 FM19" bgcolor=#fefefe
| 0 ||  || MBA-I || 18.47 || data-sort-value="0.60" | 600 m || multiple || 2002–2021 || 15 Apr 2021 || 52 || align=left | Disc.: Kitt Peak Obs. || 
|- id="2002 FV19" bgcolor=#E9E9E9
| 1 ||  || MBA-M || 17.6 || 1.7 km || multiple || 2002–2021 || 15 Mar 2021 || 27 || align=left | Disc.: Kitt Peak Obs.Added on 21 August 2021 || 
|- id="2002 FX22" bgcolor=#E9E9E9
| 1 ||  || MBA-M || 17.66 || data-sort-value="0.87" | 870 m || multiple || 2002–2021 || 16 Dec 2021 || 52 || align=left | Disc.: SpacewatchAdded on 17 January 2021 || 
|- id="2002 FC23" bgcolor=#fefefe
| 0 ||  || MBA-I || 18.41 || data-sort-value="0.62" | 620 m || multiple || 2002–2021 || 31 Aug 2021 || 102 || align=left | Disc.: SpacewatchAlt.: 2016 AJ21 || 
|- id="2002 FD23" bgcolor=#E9E9E9
| 0 ||  || MBA-M || 17.84 || data-sort-value="0.80" | 800 m || multiple || 2000–2022 || 08 Jan 2022 || 65 || align=left | Disc.: SpacewatchAlt.: 2010 JJ24 || 
|- id="2002 FO23" bgcolor=#d6d6d6
| 0 ||  || MBA-O || 17.26 || 2.0 km || multiple || 2002–2021 || 09 Aug 2021 || 31 || align=left | Disc.: Kitt Peak Obs.Alt.: 2008 EK41 || 
|- id="2002 FQ23" bgcolor=#d6d6d6
| 0 ||  || MBA-O || 17.3 || 1.9 km || multiple || 2002–2019 || 07 May 2019 || 42 || align=left | Disc.: Spacewatch || 
|- id="2002 FZ23" bgcolor=#d6d6d6
| 0 ||  || MBA-O || 17.3 || 1.9 km || multiple || 2002–2020 || 20 Oct 2020 || 45 || align=left | Disc.: Kitt Peak Obs.Alt.: 2014 PO24 || 
|- id="2002 FT25" bgcolor=#d6d6d6
| 0 ||  || MBA-O || 16.79 || 2.4 km || multiple || 2002–2021 || 13 Sep 2021 || 140 || align=left | Disc.: NEATAdded on 9 March 2021Alt.: 2018 CO5 || 
|- id="2002 FC28" bgcolor=#fefefe
| 0 ||  || MBA-I || 18.14 || data-sort-value="0.70" | 700 m || multiple || 2002–2021 || 04 Mar 2021 || 152 || align=left | Disc.: SpacewatchAlt.: 2003 SC377, 2015 FE41 || 
|- id="2002 FK32" bgcolor=#FA8072
| 0 ||  || MCA || 18.1 || 1.0 km || multiple || 2002–2020 || 13 Sep 2020 || 80 || align=left | Disc.: LONEOS || 
|- id="2002 FW36" bgcolor=#C2E0FF
| 4 ||  || TNO || 6.9 || 139 km || multiple || 2002–2015 || 23 Mar 2015 || 21 || align=left | Disc.: Kitt Peak Obs.LoUTNOs, cubewano (cold) || 
|- id="2002 FX36" bgcolor=#C2E0FF
| 3 ||  || TNO || 6.3 || 183 km || multiple || 2002–2015 || 18 Feb 2015 || 27 || align=left | Disc.: Kitt Peak Obs.LoUTNOs, cubewano (cold) || 
|- id="2002 FY36" bgcolor=#C2E0FF
| 3 ||  || TNO || 8.55 || 109 km || multiple || 2001–2019 || 18 Aug 2019 || 37 || align=left | Disc.: Kitt Peak Obs.LoUTNOs, centaur || 
|- id="2002 FO41" bgcolor=#fefefe
| 0 ||  || MBA-I || 18.2 || data-sort-value="0.68" | 680 m || multiple || 2002–2021 || 23 Jan 2021 || 53 || align=left | Disc.: Spacewatch || 
|- id="2002 FX41" bgcolor=#E9E9E9
| 0 ||  || MBA-M || 16.46 || 2.8 km || multiple || 2002–2021 || 30 Jul 2021 || 177 || align=left | Disc.: NEATAlt.: 2016 LG46 || 
|- id="2002 FD42" bgcolor=#E9E9E9
| 0 ||  || MBA-M || 17.73 || 1.2 km || multiple || 2002–2021 || 02 Oct 2021 || 90 || align=left | Disc.: Kitt Peak Obs. || 
|- id="2002 FG42" bgcolor=#d6d6d6
| 0 ||  || MBA-O || 16.97 || 2.2 km || multiple || 1994–2021 || 27 Oct 2021 || 76 || align=left | Disc.: Spacewatch || 
|- id="2002 FH42" bgcolor=#fefefe
| 3 ||  || MBA-I || 18.8 || data-sort-value="0.52" | 520 m || multiple || 2002–2016 || 03 Apr 2016 || 56 || align=left | Disc.: Spacewatch || 
|- id="2002 FL42" bgcolor=#E9E9E9
| 0 ||  || MBA-M || 17.9 || data-sort-value="0.78" | 780 m || multiple || 1995–2019 || 03 Jun 2019 || 72 || align=left | Disc.: Kitt Peak Obs. || 
|- id="2002 FM42" bgcolor=#d6d6d6
| 0 ||  || MBA-O || 16.94 || 2.3 km || multiple || 2002–2021 || 09 Jul 2021 || 48 || align=left | Disc.: Kitt Peak Obs. || 
|- id="2002 FN42" bgcolor=#E9E9E9
| 0 ||  || MBA-M || 17.77 || 1.2 km || multiple || 1991–2021 || 27 Nov 2021 || 132 || align=left | Disc.: Kitt Peak Obs. || 
|- id="2002 FO42" bgcolor=#fefefe
| 0 ||  || MBA-I || 18.30 || data-sort-value="0.65" | 650 m || multiple || 2002–2021 || 11 Apr 2021 || 94 || align=left | Disc.: Kitt Peak Obs. || 
|- id="2002 FP42" bgcolor=#E9E9E9
| 0 ||  || MBA-M || 18.60 || data-sort-value="0.57" | 570 m || multiple || 2002–2022 || 25 Jan 2022 || 51 || align=left | Disc.: Kitt Peak Obs. || 
|- id="2002 FU42" bgcolor=#d6d6d6
| 0 ||  || MBA-O || 16.7 || 2.5 km || multiple || 2002–2020 || 22 Apr 2020 || 48 || align=left | Disc.: Kitt Peak Obs. || 
|- id="2002 FV42" bgcolor=#E9E9E9
| 1 ||  || MBA-M || 17.4 || 1.8 km || multiple || 2002–2017 || 17 Oct 2017 || 43 || align=left | Disc.: Kitt Peak Obs. || 
|- id="2002 FW42" bgcolor=#fefefe
| 1 ||  || MBA-I || 18.9 || data-sort-value="0.49" | 490 m || multiple || 2002–2021 || 04 Jan 2021 || 43 || align=left | Disc.: Kitt Peak Obs. || 
|- id="2002 FX42" bgcolor=#fefefe
| 0 ||  || MBA-I || 18.32 || data-sort-value="0.64" | 640 m || multiple || 2002–2021 || 09 Apr 2021 || 62 || align=left | Disc.: LPL/Spacewatch II || 
|- id="2002 FY42" bgcolor=#E9E9E9
| 0 ||  || MBA-M || 18.16 || data-sort-value="0.98" | 980 m || multiple || 2002–2021 || 06 Oct 2021 || 68 || align=left | Disc.: Kitt Peak Obs. || 
|- id="2002 FA43" bgcolor=#d6d6d6
| 1 ||  || MBA-O || 17.87 || 1.5 km || multiple || 2002–2021 || 27 Nov 2021 || 77 || align=left | Disc.: LPL/Spacewatch II || 
|- id="2002 FB43" bgcolor=#E9E9E9
| 0 ||  || MBA-M || 17.10 || 1.1 km || multiple || 2002–2022 || 26 Jan 2022 || 102 || align=left | Disc.: Kitt Peak Obs. || 
|- id="2002 FC43" bgcolor=#d6d6d6
| 0 ||  || MBA-O || 16.8 || 2.4 km || multiple || 2002–2020 || 21 Jun 2020 || 87 || align=left | Disc.: LPL/Spacewatch II || 
|- id="2002 FD43" bgcolor=#E9E9E9
| 0 ||  || MBA-M || 18.1 || data-sort-value="0.71" | 710 m || multiple || 2002–2019 || 24 Jul 2019 || 59 || align=left | Disc.: Spacewatch || 
|- id="2002 FE43" bgcolor=#fefefe
| 0 ||  || MBA-I || 18.51 || data-sort-value="0.59" | 590 m || multiple || 2002–2021 || 13 Apr 2021 || 64 || align=left | Disc.: Spacewatch || 
|- id="2002 FF43" bgcolor=#E9E9E9
| 1 ||  || MBA-M || 18.1 || data-sort-value="0.71" | 710 m || multiple || 1994–2019 || 28 Aug 2019 || 51 || align=left | Disc.: LPL/Spacewatch II || 
|- id="2002 FG43" bgcolor=#E9E9E9
| 0 ||  || MBA-M || 17.68 || 1.2 km || multiple || 2002–2021 || 04 Oct 2021 || 78 || align=left | Disc.: Spacewatch || 
|- id="2002 FH43" bgcolor=#E9E9E9
| 0 ||  || MBA-M || 17.9 || 1.1 km || multiple || 2002–2019 || 28 Jan 2019 || 44 || align=left | Disc.: Kitt Peak Obs. || 
|- id="2002 FJ43" bgcolor=#d6d6d6
| 0 ||  || MBA-O || 17.2 || 2.0 km || multiple || 2002–2020 || 23 Oct 2020 || 43 || align=left | Disc.: Kitt Peak Obs. || 
|- id="2002 FK43" bgcolor=#E9E9E9
| 0 ||  || MBA-M || 17.5 || 1.3 km || multiple || 2002–2020 || 17 Oct 2020 || 65 || align=left | Disc.: Spacewatch || 
|- id="2002 FL43" bgcolor=#E9E9E9
| 0 ||  || MBA-M || 17.3 || 1.9 km || multiple || 2002–2021 || 03 May 2021 || 71 || align=left | Disc.: Kitt Peak Obs. || 
|- id="2002 FM43" bgcolor=#fefefe
| 0 ||  || MBA-I || 18.41 || data-sort-value="0.62" | 620 m || multiple || 2002–2021 || 13 May 2021 || 77 || align=left | Disc.: Spacewatch || 
|- id="2002 FO43" bgcolor=#d6d6d6
| 0 ||  || HIL || 15.90 || 3.7 km || multiple || 2002–2021 || 09 Nov 2021 || 130 || align=left | Disc.: SpacewatchAlt.: 2010 AK122, 2010 MC110 || 
|- id="2002 FP43" bgcolor=#E9E9E9
| 2 ||  || MBA-M || 17.9 || data-sort-value="0.78" | 780 m || multiple || 2002–2019 || 24 Oct 2019 || 64 || align=left | Disc.: LPL/Spacewatch II || 
|- id="2002 FQ43" bgcolor=#E9E9E9
| 0 ||  || MBA-M || 17.57 || data-sort-value="0.91" | 910 m || multiple || 2002–2022 || 26 Jan 2022 || 81 || align=left | Disc.: Spacewatch || 
|- id="2002 FU43" bgcolor=#E9E9E9
| 0 ||  || MBA-M || 18.1 || data-sort-value="0.71" | 710 m || multiple || 1995–2020 || 24 Oct 2020 || 66 || align=left | Disc.: Kitt Peak Obs. || 
|- id="2002 FV43" bgcolor=#fefefe
| 0 ||  || MBA-I || 18.95 || data-sort-value="0.48" | 480 m || multiple || 2002–2022 || 24 Jan 2022 || 49 || align=left | Disc.: LPL/Spacewatch II || 
|- id="2002 FW43" bgcolor=#d6d6d6
| 0 ||  || MBA-O || 17.09 || 2.1 km || multiple || 2002–2021 || 30 Sep 2021 || 43 || align=left | Disc.: Spacewatch || 
|- id="2002 FX43" bgcolor=#E9E9E9
| 0 ||  || MBA-M || 18.0 || data-sort-value="0.75" | 750 m || multiple || 2002–2020 || 13 Sep 2020 || 37 || align=left | Disc.: Kitt Peak Obs. || 
|- id="2002 FY43" bgcolor=#d6d6d6
| 0 ||  || MBA-O || 17.3 || 1.9 km || multiple || 2002–2020 || 10 Dec 2020 || 30 || align=left | Disc.: Kitt Peak Obs. || 
|- id="2002 FZ43" bgcolor=#d6d6d6
| 1 ||  || MBA-O || 17.8 || 1.5 km || multiple || 2002–2019 || 01 Nov 2019 || 40 || align=left | Disc.: Kitt Peak Obs. || 
|- id="2002 FA44" bgcolor=#fefefe
| 0 ||  || MBA-I || 18.3 || data-sort-value="0.65" | 650 m || multiple || 2002–2019 || 03 Oct 2019 || 41 || align=left | Disc.: Kitt Peak Obs. || 
|- id="2002 FB44" bgcolor=#E9E9E9
| 0 ||  || MBA-M || 18.57 || data-sort-value="0.81" | 810 m || multiple || 2002–2021 || 06 Oct 2021 || 67 || align=left | Disc.: Kitt Peak Obs. || 
|- id="2002 FC44" bgcolor=#fefefe
| 0 ||  || MBA-I || 18.7 || data-sort-value="0.54" | 540 m || multiple || 2002–2020 || 02 Feb 2020 || 63 || align=left | Disc.: Kitt Peak Obs. || 
|- id="2002 FD44" bgcolor=#fefefe
| 1 ||  || MBA-I || 18.8 || data-sort-value="0.52" | 520 m || multiple || 2002–2016 || 04 Oct 2016 || 44 || align=left | Disc.: Kitt Peak Obs. || 
|- id="2002 FF44" bgcolor=#fefefe
| 0 ||  || MBA-I || 19.4 || data-sort-value="0.39" | 390 m || multiple || 2002–2019 || 27 Sep 2019 || 25 || align=left | Disc.: Kitt Peak Obs. || 
|- id="2002 FG44" bgcolor=#fefefe
| 0 ||  || MBA-I || 19.07 || data-sort-value="0.46" | 460 m || multiple || 2002–2021 || 10 Aug 2021 || 36 || align=left | Disc.: SpacewatchAdded on 22 July 2020 || 
|- id="2002 FH44" bgcolor=#fefefe
| 0 ||  || MBA-I || 18.6 || data-sort-value="0.57" | 570 m || multiple || 2002–2020 || 14 Oct 2020 || 64 || align=left | Disc.: LPL/Spacewatch IIAdded on 22 July 2020 || 
|- id="2002 FJ44" bgcolor=#d6d6d6
| 0 ||  || MBA-O || 16.6 || 2.7 km || multiple || 2002–2020 || 15 Dec 2020 || 62 || align=left | Disc.: LPL/Spacewatch IIAdded on 17 January 2021 || 
|- id="2002 FL44" bgcolor=#d6d6d6
| 1 ||  || MBA-O || 16.9 || 2.3 km || multiple || 2002–2020 || 21 Oct 2020 || 45 || align=left | Disc.: SpacewatchAdded on 9 March 2021 || 
|- id="2002 FM44" bgcolor=#fefefe
| 0 ||  || MBA-I || 18.85 || data-sort-value="0.50" | 500 m || multiple || 2002–2021 || 11 May 2021 || 46 || align=left | Disc.: LPL/Spacewatch IIAdded on 11 May 2021 || 
|- id="2002 FN44" bgcolor=#fefefe
| 0 ||  || MBA-I || 18.53 || data-sort-value="0.58" | 580 m || multiple || 2002–2021 || 20 Mar 2021 || 33 || align=left | Disc.: Kitt Peak Obs.Added on 17 June 2021 || 
|}
back to top

References 
 

Lists of unnumbered minor planets